Willie Marvin Terrell, nicknamed "Flash", is an American former Negro league third baseman who played in the 1940s.

Terrell played for the Atlanta Black Crackers in 1943. In three recorded games, he posted one hit in ten plate appearances.

References

External links
Baseball statistics and player information from Baseball-Reference Black Baseball Stats and Seamheads

Year of birth missing
Place of birth missing
Atlanta Black Crackers players
Baseball third basemen